The Sopchoppy School (also known as Sopchoppy High School) is a historic site in Sopchoppy, Florida, located at 164 Yellow Jacket Avenue. On October 12, 2001, it was added to the U.S. National Register of Historic Places.

Gallery

Old Sopchoppy High School Marker, Sopchoppy, Fl. 

The text on the marker reads as:
" Constructed in 1924 and accredited in 1928, this was the first high school built in Wakulla County. The original stucco section, an "H"shaped design with one central area and three classrooms on each side, was made possible when Sopchoppy citizens voted in 1921 for a bond issue to cover construction costs. In the 1930s, the New Deal's Works Progress Administration (WPA) used local labor to construct the first limestone addition, containing two wings of seven classrooms and the present auditorium. The limestone portions are characteristic of Spanish mission construction and exemplify1930s master craftsmanship. In 1938-39, the second limestone addition was built, running in a north-south direction and featuring three classrooms with an adjoining hallway. Across the street, the "Spanish mission"-style gymnasium, also built during this time, has been restored for use during private, cultural and civic events. The school was integrated in 1966-67 and is listed on the National Register of Historic Places. The building is architecturally significant due to its style and the master craftsmanship used in cutting its 18- to 20-inch thick walls of native limestone, which was mined approximately 12 miles north of Sopchoppy." National Register of Historic Places NRIS #01001088
Sponsors: WAKULLA COUNTY SCHOOL BOARD AND THE FLORIDA DEPARTMENT OF STATE
Latitude, Longitude
30.05835278, -84.49332500
Source:Old Sopchoppy High School Marker, Sopchoppy, FL
George Lansing Taylor Jr., University of North Florida
Creation Date 11-27-2009

References

External links
 Wakulla County listings at National Register of Historic Places
 Sopchoppy School at Florida's Office of Cultural and Historical Programs
 http://www.wtxl.com/features/relic-of-the-old-days-holds-key-to-
 sopchoppy-secrets/article_28195188-3cb1-11e6-b8b4-1b31849044bf.html
 https://commons.wikimedia.org/wiki/Category:Old_Sopchoppy_High_School_Gymnasium
 https://www.floridamemory.com/items/show/8592
 http://www.thewakullanews.com/content/sopchoppy-high-school-reunion-will-be-april-12

High schools in Wakulla County, Florida
Public high schools in Florida
School buildings on the National Register of Historic Places in Florida
National Register of Historic Places in Wakulla County, Florida
School buildings completed in 1924
Works Progress Administration in Florida
1924 establishments in Florida